Winner Jumalon (born 28 December 1983, in Zamboanga, Philippines) is a Manila-based Filipino modern visual artist.  His works with oil and encaustic on canvas have been described as "late capitalist masterpieces marred by illogical marks, haze, and aggregations of reality that not only displaces portraiture as the totemic symbols of power and status but questions the formation of identity itself as the trap where a man cannot go forward".

Jumalon was awarded the Artist Award of the Cultural Center of the Philippines in 2009, and has been represented by both Sotheby's and Christie's with consecutively increasing valuations in the secondary market. Jumalon has denied that economic success informs his paintings, and states that his works are instead antagonistic to the dictatorship and reification of the market. His projects seek a re-evaluation of some of the most fundamental positions that art has assumed in the past.

Biography

Jumalon trained for four years at the Philippine High School for the Arts at Mt. Makiling, Los Banos, Laguna, with a major in Visual Arts. After high school, Jumalon pursued his childhood dream of entering the College of Fine Arts of the University of the Philippines in Diliman, Quezon City. He graduated with a baccalaureate in fine arts, majoring in painting.

Work

The dialogue of Jumalon's work features spaces he inhabits or inhabited. These spaces include Zamboanga, his childhood home; Laguna, where he was a Philippine government scholar; and Quezon City, where he studied fine arts in UP.

Juamlon said that these spaces seem to be about his identity as well. Art cohabits a relation with spaces, and people as well, including teachers and friends who have allowed him to evolve, and share the life he has lived with them. He talks about his art as a matter of ideas that come from these everyday encounters with the world. And at this point, it is this art that seems to define him as a person who relates to his surroundings as well. Jumalon finds inspiration in anything and everything-—a candy wrapper, a moment, debris. He takes much from the past and speaks of it in the present, where nostalgia doesn’t necessarily mean memory as it does an assertion of what remains relevant and real across time. Jumalon begins with ideas and challenges himself to transform them into a visual form-—the only one he feels is powerful enough to carry his message. The materials to use, and the ways in which they will be utilized, are all part of the concept. They enjoin together after the decision is made that an idea is worth its value in paint and hard work. And then Jumalon, apparently, flies with it. The challenge to him has been the creation of something powerful and interesting. This beauty can represent the kind of life he sees and loves and knows. Jumalon finds solace in the urban spaces he occupies and imagines this space as distinctly pregnant with meaning and ideas and visual possibilities. It’s an interesting view of the contemporary fast-paced city life that we all are part of. At most, it is a powerful rendering of the lives we live by someone who now knows the identity and the owning of his space(s), and has chosen to live among us. He thus can speak for us, and in that sense, his art is ours as well.

Back in his native land, he painted mostly colorful self-portraits. Whimsical and carefree are the auras that describe his works.

Spending his high school life in Laguna has been still artistically inclined having visual arts as his major. His paintings were done in subdued earth colors.
He was then living in a mountain where his school is located, learning the rigors of the academic world.

A winner was fondling for an identity, painting self-portraits. It came to pass, he started using a layering technique, and drawing faces over faces, an observation perhaps, watching fellow students with their diverse individuality go under guises just to create that harmony.

Now, he lives alone, playing with wide spaces and abstract figures, graffiti, and black scratches on white background. He sees blunt black and white, anonymous, animosity, bare, his insight of urbanity.  Random and varied images are his confidant to fit and sustain in his necessary evolution.

Awards

Accolades
 2005 
 Top 5 Finalist in Philip Morris Award ASEAN Art Competition
 2003
 Top 50 Finalist in Philip Morris ASEAN Art Competition
 Finalist (Water media on paper category) Metrobank Art Competition
 Jose Moreno Scholarship Pitoy Moreno Foundation
 Best Artwork for the Philippine Collegian
 Best Editorial Cartoon for the Philippine Collegian
2002 
Finalist (oil/acrylic category) in 35th National Shell Art Competition
Semi-Finalist (Oil on Canvas) Metrobank Art Competition
2001 
Honorable Mention in 34th National Shell Art Competition

Solo exhibitions

2010 
A Part, Winner Jumalon Solo Exhibit runs from 6 to 30 June at Pinto Art Gallery, #1 Sierra Madre Heights, Grandheights, Antipolo City. 
2008 
Eslite Gallery Taipei, Taiwan 
2007
Destroyed Images Ark Galerie Jakarta
2006
 Face Values, Richard Koh Fine Art in Kuala Lumpur, Malaysia
2005
About Face, The Drawing Room in Makati, Philippines

Group exhibitions

2010
Pachingguel “Pach” Hortillanos, Winner JumalonRecent Find, Manila Contemporary
2008
Showcase Singapore, Singapore
Hong Kong International Art Fair, Hong Kong
CIGE 2008 Beijing Art Fair, Beijing, China
Bridge Art Fair New York, New York, U.S.A.
2007
Scope Miami, The Drawing Room @ Miami, Florida, U.S.A.
Art Singapore, The Drawing Room, Level 4, Suntec Building, Singapore
2006
The Drawing Room @Dubai Art Fair International Exhibitions & Conferences
the United Arab Emirates >ART Singapore, The Drawing Room, Level 6, Suntec Building, Singapore
New Directions, The Rotunda Gallery, Neilson Hays Library, 195 Surawong Road,	Bangkok, Thailand
Utterly Art & The Drawing Room South Bridge Road, Singapore
2005
Art Taipei 2005 Taipei, Taiwan
Art Singapore 2005 The Drawing Room, Suntec Building, Singapore
2004
Asian Art Contemporary Singapore The Drawing Room, Suntec Building, Singapore
2003
Top 50 Finalists Metropolitan Museum, Roxas Blvd., Manila, Philippines
Art Rush Metrobank Plaza, Makati Avenue, Makati, Philippines
“Box Environment” Ayala Museum, Stock Exchange Bldg., Makati, Philippines
2002
Metrobank Art Competition Metrobank Plaza, Makati Avenue, Makati, Philippines
35th Shell Art Competition SM Megamall, Artwalk, Mandaluyong, Philippines
2001
34th Shell Art Competition Greenhills, San Juan, Philippines
“I-Works” Nemiranda Arthouse, SM Megamall, Mandaluyong, Philippines
“Anim-a” Thesis Exhibition UP Faculty Center, Diliman, Quezon City, Philippines
2000
"Makiling sa Tabi ng Dagat” Cultural Center of the Philippines

Resources

http://misc.inquirer.net/nokia/youngartists/profile.html

http://www.drawingroomgallery.com/pdf/winner_jumalon.pdf

http://www.manilaartblogger.com/2010/06/07/winner-jumalons-unusual-portraits/

http://www.utterlyart.com.sg/artists/view/83

http://angfierranijuana.wordpress.com/tag/winner-jumalon/

http://www.drawingroomgallery.com/contemporary/images/artworks/5/press/1134025247.pdf

http://www.artslant.com/ew/events/show/248275-recent-find

References

Living people
1983 births
Filipino painters
People from Zamboanga City
 University of the Philippines Diliman alumni